Vachellia origena is a species of plant in the family Fabaceae. It is found in Eritrea, Ethiopia, and Yemen.

References

origena
Flora of Northeast Tropical Africa
Flora of Yemen
Near threatened plants
Taxonomy articles created by Polbot